La Roca de la Sierra is a municipality in the province of Badajoz, Extremadura, Spain. It has a population of 1,579 and an area of 108.58 km². It is the location of the Monastery of San Isidro de Loriana, a Bien de Interes Cultural in a state of ruin.

References

Municipalities in the Province of Badajoz